The 2014 Coke Zero 400 powered by Coca-Cola was a NASCAR Sprint Cup Series stock car race that was scheduled to be held on July 5, 2014 but was pushed to July 6, 2014, at Daytona International Speedway in Daytona Beach, Florida. Contested over 112 laps, it was the 18th race of the 2014 NASCAR Sprint Cup Series season. Aric Almirola was leading when the race was called for rain and scored his first career win and the No. 43's first win since the 1999 Goody's Body Pain 500. Brian Vickers was second, while Kurt Busch, Casey Mears, and top rookie Austin Dillon rounded out the top five. Behind Dillon, the top rookies of the race were Alex Bowman in 13th, and Michael Annett in 21st.

Previous week's race
In what was an absolutely dominating performance from Team Penske, Brad Keselowski led 199 of the 267 laps to win the Quaker State 400 at Kentucky Speedway. He described his car as "awesome" and that his crew did a "great job".

Report

Background

The track's turns are banked at 31 degrees, while the front stretch, the location of the finish line, is banked at 18 degrees. Jimmie Johnson was the defending race winner from the 2013 event.

Following the Daytona 500 in February,  of additional SAFER barriers were added to the circuit, in order to improve safety. The additional barriers were added from the exit of turn four, through the tri-oval and to the entrance of turn one; this left only the super stretch outside walls with concrete barriers. "We're always looking at ways to enhance our safety and it is a priority for us," said Lenny Santiago, senior director of public relations for Daytona International Speedway. "Whenever we have an incident on track, we always take a look in consultation with NASCAR, the University of Nebraska and other experts that are a part of the Motorsports Technology Group and take their recommendations. In consultation with them, we made sure we added additional safer barriers to these areas."

Prior to the start of the race, Barney Hall announced that this race would be his last in the booth for the Motor Racing Network. "The years have gone by so quick, it's just so hard to believe," Hall said with a smile during a break at Daytona International Speedway. "The voice of NASCAR is the voice of MRN and that's Barney Hall," said David Hyatt, president and executive producer of Motor Racing Network. "To have him still be a part of what we do in a way that highlights all the memories that he has, all the history he's brought to the sport, everything that he's done, not just for this MRN brand but for the NASCAR brand is an important part of this transition. MRN isn't MRN without Barney Hall."

Entry list
The entry list for the Coke Zero 400 was released on Tuesday, July 1, 2014 at 11:40 a.m. Eastern time. Forty-four cars were entered for the race.

*Was taken off of the car due to NASCAR rules and regulations. Replaced with a black hood.

Practice
Two practice sessions were scheduled for the Sprint Cup Series at Daytona. The first practice session was delayed an hour by weather and shortened to 45 minutes. The final practice session was cancelled due to weather.

Qualifying

David Gilliland won the pole with a lap time of 45.531 and a speed of  after only one round of knockout qualifying was completed due to weather. Gilliland stated that his pole position would be a "morale booster" for his Front Row Motorsports team. Joe Nemechek was the one driver that failed to qualify.

Qualifying results

Race

First half

Start
The race was scheduled to start at 7:45 p.m. Eastern time on Saturday evening, but the start was delayed by rain and finally pushed to the next day at 11:13 a.m. The start was pushed a pace lap due to light sprinkles in turns one and two and then another lap. After a total of seven pace laps, David Gilliland finally led the field to the green at 11:21 a.m. Matt Kenseth took the lead from Gilliland on lap five, before the first caution of the race flew for rain on lap 6, which ultimately led to a 26-minute delay under red flag conditions.

The Big One
The race restarted on lap 13, before Tony Stewart took the lead on lap 17. A competition caution was planned upon the completion of lap 20, but the second caution of the race flew on lap 20 for a multi-car wreck in the tri-oval. A total of 16 cars were involved, including points leader Jeff Gordon, defending race winner Jimmie Johnson and Dale Earnhardt Jr., the Daytona 500 winner. Ricky Stenhouse Jr. – who was also involved in the incident – stated that he had been "heading straight...had it saved and had it straight again and got caught in the left rear." Only Johnson and A. J. Allmendinger were eliminated from the race due to the pileup.

The race restarted on lap 29, before Reed Sorenson, Landon Cassill, David Gilliland and Jamie McMurray took turns at the head of the race, prior to the third caution of the race, on lap 41, due to debris in turn 1. The race restarted on lap 45 with McMurray leading the way. Greg Biffle took the lead on lap 52, while Kurt Busch took the lead on lap 60. Biffle retook the lead on lap 86, before the start of the pit cycle, coming under green flag conditions. Gordon took the lead before it cycled back to Kurt Busch on lap 89. Debris on the backstretch brought out the caution for the fourth time on lap 94.

Second half

The Huge One
The race restarted on lap 98 and the fifth caution flew for another multi-car wreck on the back straightaway collecting 26 cars. It started when Kasey Kahne got turned by Greg Biffle and Kahne turned down into Joey Logano. Everyone checked up but piled into other cars triggering the wreck. During the wreck, Cole Whitt came down the race track and ended up hitting the right rear of Kyle Busch's car and ended up turning Busch upside down. Busch even joked around while being upside down on his radio saying "Just having a good old time over here" with his spotter responding "Just hanging around?". The red flag was displayed for the second time. The cars involved in the wreck were Kasey Kahne, Greg Biffle, Joey Logano, Cole Whitt, Kyle Busch, Clint Bowyer, Alex Bowman, David Gilliland, Justin Allgaier, Ryan Newman, Paul Menard, Josh Wise, Michael Annett, Ryan Truex, Bobby Labonte, Matt Kenseth, Landon Cassill, Jamie McMurray, Marcos Ambrose, David Ragan, Denny Hamlin, Danica Patrick, Brad Keselowski, Terry Labonte, Reed Sorenson, and Michael McDowell. Gilliland described the incident as "all heck broke loose all at once", while Kyle Busch had driven through the grass before his car dug in and sent him back towards traffic; he described his roll as "real slow", After 4 minutes and 48 seconds, the red flag was lifted and the field continued under caution.

Mother Nature finally wins
The race restarted on lap 105, and it remained green for 5 laps, The sixth caution of the race flew on lap 109 again for rain, and the cars were brought back down pit road as the race was red flagged for the third time. Eventually, NASCAR called the race and Almirola scored his first career win. Almirola's victory was the first for a car numbered 43, since John Andretti did so in the 1999 Goody's Body Pain 500 at Martinsville Speedway. For the first time since the 2007 UAW-DaimlerChrysler 400, all top ten starting drivers failed to finish within the top ten positions.

Post-race infractions
On the Tuesday following the race, Kurt Busch was penalized 10 points for a technical infraction following post-race inspection. The infraction was a P2 level penalty and a violation of section 12-1 (actions detrimental to stock car racing) and 20–12 (l) (for events at Daytona International Speedway and Talladega Superspeedway, at all times, the Delta (or difference) of the Z-height measurement between the center of the panhard bar mounting bolt located at the left truck trailing arm and the center of the panhard bar mounting bolt, located at the right rear sub-frame mounting bracket, must not exceed three inches) of the 2014 NASCAR rule book.

Race results

Race summary
 Lead changes: 21 among different drivers
 Cautions/Laps: 6 for 29
 Red flags: 3 for 1 hour, 30 minutes and 31 seconds
 Time of race: 2 hours, 9 minutes and 13 seconds
 Average speed:

Media

Television

Radio

Standings after the race

Drivers' Championship standings

Manufacturers' Championship standings

Note: Only the first sixteen positions are included for the driver standings.

Notes

References

Coke Zero 400
Coke Zero 400
Coke Zero 400
NASCAR races at Daytona International Speedway